Cherif Dieye (born 11 January 1997) is a Senegalese football player who plays as a winger for USL League One club Central Valley Fuego.

Career

Youth & college
Dieye played three seasons with the IMG Academy in Florida, before going to play college soccer at the University of Louisville in 2016. During his time with the Cardinals, Dieye made 80 appearances, scored 19 goals and tallied eight assists. In 2018 he was named ACC Championship All-Tournament Team and All-ACC Third Team, and in 2019 USC All-South Region Second Team and All-ACC Second Team.

Professional
On 9 January 2020, Dieye was selected 15th overall in the 2020 MLS SuperDraft by New York Red Bulls. He signed with their USL Championship affiliate side New York Red Bulls II on 2 March 2020.

He made his professional debut on 17 July 2020, starting against Hartford Athletic.

He was released by Red Bulls II on November 30, 2020.

On 2 May 2022, Dieye signed with USL League One side Central Valley Fuego.

References

External links
Cherif Dieye at University of Louisville Athletics

1997 births
Association football midfielders
Central Valley Fuego FC players
Living people
New York Red Bulls II players
New York Red Bulls draft picks
Senegalese footballers
Senegalese expatriate footballers
Footballers from Dakar
USL Championship players
USL League One players